Anolis annectens, the annex anole, is a species of lizard in the family Dactyloidae. The species is found in Venezuela.

References

Anoles
Reptiles of Venezuela
Endemic fauna of Venezuela
Reptiles described in 1974
Taxa named by Ernest Edward Williams